SS Ada was a cargo vessel built for the London and South Western Railway in 1905.

History

The SS Ada was built by Gourlay Brothers in Dundee and launched on 4 April 1905 by Miss Drummond. She was launched only 47 days after the keel was laid, without overtime being worked, and represented a record for the Gourlay shipyard. She was the first of a pair of ships ordered by the London and South Western Railway, the other being . She was built for light cargo traffic between Southampton and the Channel Islands.

She was acquired by the Southern Railway in 1923.

She was scrapped in 1934.

References

1905 ships
Steamships of the United Kingdom
Ships of the London and South Western Railway
Ships of the Southern Railway (UK)
Ships built in Dundee